Events in the year 1846 in Portugal.

Incumbents
Monarch: Mary II
Prime Ministers: António Bernardo da Costa Cabral, 1st Marquis of Tomar; Pedro de Sousa Holstein, 1st Duke of Palmela; João Carlos Saldanha de Oliveira Daun, 1st Duke of Saldanha

Events
6 October – Emboscada (palace coup)
19 November – Banco de Portugal established

Arts and entertainment

Sports

Births

21 March – Rafael Bordalo Pinheiro, artist, comics creator (d. 1905).

5 November – Joaquim Pimenta de Castro, military officer, mathematician and politician (died 1918)

Deaths

References

 
1840s in Portugal
Years of the 19th century in Portugal
Portugal